Jüri Uluots' cabinet was in office from 12 October 1939 to 21 June 1940. It was dismissed at the request of the Soviet Union.

Members
This cabinet's members were the following:
Jüri Uluots  - Prime Minister
August Jürima (died 15 June 1942 ) - Acting Prime Minister (from 28 October 1939 ), Minister of Interior
Paul Kogermann - Minister of Public Education
Albert Assor (died 16 September 1943 ) - Minister of Justice
Leo Sepp (died 13 December 1941 ) - Minister of Economic Affairs
Artur Tupits (died 28 October 1941 ) - Minister of Agriculture
Oskar Kask (killed on 13 April 1942 ) - Minister of Social Affairs
Nikolai Reek (executed on 8 May 1942 ) - Minister of War
Nikolai Viitak (executed on 24 April 1942 ) - Minister of Communications
Ants Piip (died 1 October 1942 ) - Minister of Foreign Affairs
Ants Oidermaa (sentenced to death on 2 July 1941 ) - minister (Head of the Information Centre, until 6 May 1940 Head of the State Propaganda Service)

References

Cabinets of Estonia